Helga Balk is a South African pair skater. With partner Gavin MacPherson, she won the silver medal at the 1977 World Junior Figure Skating Championships, which were known as the I.S.U. Junior Figure Skating Championships at the time.

References
  

Year of birth missing (living people)
Living people
South African pair skaters
World Junior Figure Skating Championships medalists